The West Indies cricket team toured South Africa from 10 December 2014 to 28 January 2015. The tour consisted of three Twenty20 Internationals (T20Is), three Test matches and five One Day Internationals (ODIs). With South Africa's 2–0 win in the Test series, they retained the number one position in the Test rankings.

In the second Twenty20 International, the West Indies set a new world record for the highest successful run chase in a T20I match. In the second ODI, AB de Villiers set the record for the fastest fifty (16 balls) and the fastest hundred (31 balls) in ODI history. South Africa's score of 439/2 in that game is their highest in the 50-over format. South Africa won the ODI series 4–1.

Squads

Tour Matches

West Indians v SA Invitational XI

Test series

1st Test

2nd Test

3rd Test

T20I series

1st T20I

2nd T20I

3rd T20I

ODI series

1st ODI

2nd ODI

3rd ODI

4th ODI

5th ODI

Broadcasters

References

External links 
Series Page on Wisden
 

2014 in West Indian cricket
International cricket competitions in 2014–15
2014 in South African cricket
2015 in West Indian cricket
2015 in South African cricket
2014-15